Cezary Trybański (born September 22, 1979) is a Polish former professional basketball player. He is a 7'2" 235 lb center. He was the first Polish-born player in the National Basketball Association (NBA).

Born in Warsaw, he is the brother of a Polish triple jumper, Małgorzata Trybańska.

Early career
In Poland, he played for Legia Warszawa in 1997-98 and MKS Pruszkow of PLK league from 1999 to 2002. Previously, he played in Shmoolky, which is, and was in 1990s, one of the best non-professional/amateur clubs in Warsaw.

NBA career
Cezary Trybański signed a 3-year contract worth $4.8 million with the Memphis Grizzlies on July 22, 2002. He became the first Polish-born player to appear in an NBA game on November 15, 2002, in a six-minute debut. He played a total of 22 NBA games with the Memphis Grizzlies, the Phoenix Suns, and the New York Knicks from 2002 to 2004. On August 5, 2004, he was traded to the Chicago Bulls in a six-player trade that sent Jamal Crawford to the New York Knicks. In October 2004, he was waived by the Bulls. In 2005, he was selected 63rd overall in the 2005 NBDL Draft by the Tulsa 66ers. He appeared in 45 games, making 15 starts and put up averages of 3.5 PPG, 3.3 RPG, and nearly 2 blocks in just 16 minutes. In October 2006, he signed a contract with the Toronto Raptors worth about US$600,000. Soon after signing this deal, Trybanski was released. He was then reacquired by the 76ers. He was waived on November 22, 2006, to rehabilitate an injury, and re-signed on December 1, 2006.

Trybański's final NBA game was on March 7, 2004, in a 99-86 win over the Washington Wizards where he only played for 50 seconds, substituting at the very end of the game for Stephon Marbury. In that 50 seconds, Trybański missed his only field-goal attempt but was able to record 1 steal thanks to a bad pass by Wizards' player Steve Blake.

References

External links
Tyrbanski's NBA Profile
Cezary Trybanski's Stats at Basketball-Reference.com
Bighorns add a long frame to the Roster, Cezary Trybanski

1979 births
Living people
AZS Koszalin players
Basketball players from Warsaw
Centers (basketball)
Legia Warsaw (basketball) players
Memphis Grizzlies players
MKS Znicz Basket Pruszków players
National Basketball Association players from Poland
New York Knicks players
Peristeri B.C. players
Phoenix Suns players
Polish expatriate basketball people in the United States
Polish men's basketball players
Reno Bighorns players
Tulsa 66ers players
Undrafted National Basketball Association players